Burnley High School is a mixed secondary free school located in the town and Borough of Burnley, Lancashire, England. The school opened in September 2014 with only 32 11-year-old pupils (Year 7) but quickly grew to over-subscription. The school has expanded over the succeeding years and now has a capacity of 600 pupils. The school celebrated its first set of GCSE results under Head Teacher Mr Phill Walmsley in 2019.

Operated by the Education Partnership Trust (EPT), the school plans to educate pupils within a family ethos, instilling a strong sense of community and social responsibility, with Burnley Life Church a supporting partner since the schools launch The school initially opened in the Parkhill Business Centre in Padiham Road, while a new building was constructed nearby on the site of the former Habergham High School (Burnley Grammar School). Its launch has been controversial as other schools in the town have hundreds of vacant places. The school moved the three existing year-groups into the new building in April 2017, with the school's first Ofsted inspection occurring shortly after and returning a "good" rating. The first year-group celebrated its GCSE results in 2019.

References

External links
 Burnley High School website
 New Burnley High School taking shape. Burnley Express, April 2016
IN PICTURES: Burnley High School's new multi-million pound building set to be finished next year. Lancashire Telegraph, April 2016
 New Burnley high school design unveiled. Burnley Express, June 2015

Free schools in England
Educational institutions established in 2014
Schools in Burnley
Secondary schools in Lancashire
2014 establishments in England